TPC Scottsdale is a 36-hole golf complex in the southwestern United States, located in Scottsdale, Arizona, northeast of Phoenix.

Opened  in 1986, the resort is part of the Tournament Players Club network of golf courses operated by the PGA Tour. The Stadium Course has been home to the tour's annual Phoenix Open since 1987.

Stadium Course
Tom Weiskopf and Jay Morrish were commissioned by the PGA Tour to build a course to host the Phoenix Open starting in 1987.

The par-3 16th hole on the Stadium Course is the only fully enclosed hole on the PGA Tour. The grandstands that surround the 16th, which have a capacity of 20,000, are home to one of the most enthusiastic crowds on the PGA Tour. A shot that lands on the green will result in cheers from the crowd, while a shot that misses the green will result in boos. Tiger Woods scored an ace (hole in one) on this hole during the 1997 Phoenix Open, sending the crowd in attendance into a frenzy.

Scorecard

Champions Course
The second course at TPC Scottsdale is the Champions Course, which was designed by Randy Heckenkemper, and completed in 2007. This course replaced the original Weiskopf and Morrish designed Desert Course.

Scorecard

References

External links
 Official site
 Picture of the Stadium Course

Golf clubs and courses in Arizona
Sports competitions in Scottsdale, Arizona
1986 establishments in Arizona
Sports venues completed in 1986